Kulebaki Metallurgical Production Association is a company based in Kulebaki, Russia and established in 1866.

The Kulebaki Metallurgical Plant was one of a group of metallurgical enterprises subordinate to the now-defunct Soviet Ministry of Aviation Industry which manufactured semi-finished products from steel, aluminum, magnesium, titanium, nickel, and super alloys for use in aerospace systems. It is now offering semi-finished metallurgical products for the civil market. In 2005 the company was united with the Kulebak Ring Rolling Plant under the new Ruspolymet brand.

References

Manufacturing companies of Russia
Companies based in Nizhny Novgorod Oblast
Ministry of the Aviation Industry (Soviet Union)
Metal companies of the Soviet Union
Aerospace companies of the Soviet Union
Companies nationalised by the Soviet Union